The Dom Osório Stoffel State Park is a state park in the state of Mato Grosso, Brazil.
It protects an area of the cerrado biome.

Location

The Dom Osório Stoffel State Park is in the municipality of Rondonópolis, Mato Grosso.
It extends south from the Vermelho River to the west of the Rondonópolis Airport.
The Ribeirăo Ponte da Pedra runs through the park from the south to join the Vermelho.

Environment

The park is in the cerrado biome.
It has more than 280 species of trees and 500 species of fauna, including several threatened with extinction.
The park is rich in watercourses, waterfalls and wildlife, and is a breeding area for fish.
The goal is to protect water resources, allow movement of native fauna species and preserve a representative sample of the ecosystems, while allowing controlled use by the public for education and scientific research.

History

The Dom Osório Stoffel State Park was created by decree 5.437 of 12 November 2002.
The consultative council was created on 6 October 2010.
The management plan was published on 12 November 2012, providing guidance on how the park can be used in a sustainable way for purposes such as ecotourism and environmental education.
On 17 October 2014 the proprietors of land in the park were asked to present documentation on their claims.

Notes

Sources

State parks of Brazil
Protected areas established in 2002
2002 establishments in Brazil
Protected areas of Mato Grosso